Aaron Coyne, known professionally as Yawning Chasm, is an Irish alternative folk singer-songwriter from County Galway.

Music career

Coyne was one half of the Galway electro-folk duo ‘’Mirakil Whip’’ in the early 2000’s. The group, with fellow Galway musician Anne Marie Deacy, released an EP on the Rusted Rail label and performed a tour of South Korea. His debut album as Yawning Chasm, ‘’A Shadow is That Hidden’’, was released in 2009 by Rusted Rail. Italian website Ondarock, reviewed the album positively, comparing the music to that of Red House Painters. Review website indieville.com wrote: "The Shadow That Is Hidden may be frustratingly short, but it's also consistently great, and that helps make it one of the strongest psychedelic folk releases in recent memory."
In 2013, the track Peripheral Eyes featured on the compilation Abandon Reason which was recorded at an abandoned car park in Galway city. The Quietus wrote that the track was "breezy and light-footed." He released his self-titled album later that year, with The Irish Times writing: "His cosy, wintry, self-titled new album will keep you warm during the cold months." In 2019, Coyne was part of a documentary for RTÉ 2XM which focused on independent artists working in Ireland.

Discography

Albums

The Shadow Is That Hidden, Rusted Rail, 2009
Snarl, 2012
Yawning Chasm, 2013
Skylights, 2016
Songs From Blue Home, 2018
us and then, 2020
The Golden Hour, 2022

References

External links
Yawning Chasm on Bandcamp

Irish folk singers
21st-century Irish people
Living people
Irish male singers
Year of birth missing (living people)